The Parkview Apartments is a historic apartment building at 300 West 13th Avenue in Pine Bluff, Arkansas.  It is a two-story masonry structure, built out of buff brick.  It is a U-shaped building, with Classical Revival features, including a projecting cornice and a crenellated parapet at the center of the U.  Built in about 1925, this twelve-unit building was then the largest apartment building in the state in terms of total square footage.  Parkview Apartments was the work of O.C. Hauber, a businessman who played a major role in the growth and development of Pine Bluff in the early 20th century.

The property was listed on the National Register of Historic Places in 1989.

See also
National Register of Historic Places listings in Jefferson County, Arkansas

References

Apartment buildings on the National Register of Historic Places in Arkansas
National Register of Historic Places in Pine Bluff, Arkansas
Residential buildings completed in 1925
1925 establishments in Arkansas